Erpetogomphus elaps, the straight-tipped ringtail, is a species of clubtail in the family of dragonflies known as Gomphidae. It is found in Central America.

The IUCN conservation status of Erpetogomphus elaps is "LC", least concern, with no immediate threat to the species' survival. The population is stable.

References

Further reading

 

Gomphidae
Articles created by Qbugbot
Insects described in 1858